Garlan Gudger Jr. is an American politician. A Republican, he is a member of the Alabama State Senate, representing the 4th district since November 7, 2018. He is the second-generation owner of the antiques store Southern Accents Architectural Antiques. He is a strong supporter of the Human Life Protection Act, which aims to criminalize abortion in the state of Alabama. He is also a member of the Small Business Commission.

References

External links
 Official legislature page
 Vote Smart - Biography

Living people
Republican Party Alabama state senators
21st-century American politicians
Year of birth missing (living people)